, also known as  for short, is a Japanese romantic comedy manga series written and illustrated by Hiroyuki. It began serialization in Kodansha's Weekly Shōnen Magazine in March 2020, and has been compiled into fourteen tankōbon volumes as of February 2023. An anime television series adaptation by Tezuka Productions aired from July to September 2021 on the Animeism programming block. A second season has been announced.

Plot
The series follows Naoya Mukai, who had recently begun a relationship with his childhood friend Saki Saki. Nagisa Minase, his classmate, decides to confess her feelings to him as well, and after some initial hesitation, he accepts her request to be her boyfriend as well. Naoya decides that he will have both Saki and Nagisa as girlfriends at the same time. As Naoya currently lives alone due to his parents living elsewhere for work, Saki and Nagisa decide to live with him. The series follows their daily school life, as Naoya, Saki, and Nagisa experience difficulties and challenges in maintaining their love triangle relationship.

Characters

Naoya is Saki's childhood friend. He confessed to her every month until she accepted, but also agrees to take Nagisa as a girlfriend as well as he found her to be cute. He is an only child; as such, he hopes to have a girlfriend who has siblings.

Naoya's childhood friend and his initial girlfriend. She shares a first and last name as her parents thought such a name would be cute. She has a complex about her small chest, especially when compared to Nagisa. She is a member of their school's basketball club.

A classmate of Naoya, who becomes his second girlfriend after confessing to him. She was previously a shy girl who felt that she was not good at anything, then fell in love with Naoya as he inspired her to pursue skills that she was good at.

A schoolmate of Naoya. She is secretly a popular vlogger who goes by the online alias . She intends to become Naoya's third girlfriend, going as far as stalking him and his girlfriends, as well as camping outside his house to get his attention. She often uses her large breasts to catch attention online.

Saki's best friend and classmate who comes from a rich family. She is at the top of their class academically. She discovers Naoya's romantic arrangement with Saki and Nagisa and she disapproves of it. It is later discovered that she has feelings for Naoya as well.

Rika and Risa's father.

Rika's younger sister.

Production
Girlfriend, Girlfriend is based on Seiseidōdō, Futamata-suru Hanashi ("A Story of Two-timing but Fair and Square"), which Hiroyuki had uploaded on Twitter and later published in Comiket 86 in August 2019.

Media

Manga
The manga by Hiroyuki began serialization in Kodansha's Weekly Shōnen Magazine on March 4, 2020. Fourteen tankōbon volumes have been published as of February 17, 2023. A commercial to promote the series, starring Ayana Taketatsu and Ayane Sakura, was released on October 23, 2020.

In February 2021, Kodansha USA announced the English digital release of the series in North America and the first volume was released on April 6, 2021.

Volume list

Chapters not yet in tankōbon format

Anime
In November 2020, the 51st issue of Weekly Shōnen Magazine announced that the series would receive an anime television series adaptation. Tezuka Productions animated the series, with Satoshi Kuwabara as director, Keiichirō Ōchi as scriptwriter, and Akiko Toyoda designing the characters. Miki Sakurai and Tatsuhiko Saiki composed the series' music. It aired from July 3 to September 18, 2021 on the Animeism programming block on MBS, TBS, and BS-TBS, as well as AT-X. Necry Talkie performed the series' opening theme song , while Momo Asakura performed the series' ending theme song . Crunchyroll licensed the series outside of Asia. Muse Communication licensed the series in South and Southeast Asia, and streamed it on its YouTube channel, iQIYI, and Bilibili. On August 9, 2022, Crunchyroll announced the series would receive an English dub, which premiered the same day.

On September 16, 2022, it was announced that the anime would be receiving a second season.

Episode list

Notes

References

External links
 
 
Girlfriend, Girlfriend on Twitter 

2021 anime television series debuts
Anime series based on manga
Animeism
Crunchyroll anime
Kodansha manga
Muse Communication
NBCUniversal Entertainment Japan
Polyamory in fiction
Romantic comedy anime and manga
School life in anime and manga
Shōnen manga
Tezuka Productions
Upcoming anime television series